The history of life on Earth is closely associated with environmental change on multiple spatial and temporal scales. Climate change is a long-term change in the average weather patterns that have come to define Earth’s local, regional and global climates. These changes have a broad range of observed effects that are synonymous with the term. Climate change is any significant long term change in the expected pattern, whether due to natural variability or as a result of human activity. Predicting the effects that climate change will have on plant biodiversity can be achieved using various models, however bioclimatic models are most commonly used.

Environmental conditions play a key role in defining the function and geographic distributions of plants, in combination with other factors, thereby modifying patterns of biodiversity. Changes in long term environmental conditions that can be collectively coined climate change are known to have had enormous impacts on current plant diversity patterns; further impacts are expected in the future. It is predicted that climate change will remain one of the major drivers of biodiversity patterns in the future. Human actions are currently triggering the sixth major mass extinction the Earth has experienced, changing the distribution and abundance of many plants. A 2022 evaluation of vascular plant species suggests that species with no major uses in human society are much more likely to go extinct compared to plants actively cultivated for human purposes such as agriculture or urban decoration.

Palaeo context

The Earth has experienced a constantly changing climate in the time since plants first evolved. These changes have been reflected by constantly shifting vegetation, for example forest communities dominating most areas in interglacial periods, and herbaceous communities dominating during glacial periods. It has been shown through fossil records that past climatic change has been a major driver of the processes of speciation and extinction. The best known example of this is the Carboniferous Rainforest Collapse which occurred 350 million years ago. This event decimated amphibian populations and spurred on the evolution of reptiles.

Modern context
There is significant current interest and research focus on the phenomenon of recent anthropogenic climate changes, or global warming. Focus is on identifying the current impacts of climate change on biodiversity, and predicting these effects into the future.

Changing climatic variables relevant to the function and distribution of plants include increasing  concentrations, increasing global temperatures, altered precipitation patterns, and changes in the pattern of 'extreme weather events such as cyclones, fires or storms. Highly variable species distribution has resulted from different models with variable bioclimatic changes.

Because individual plants and therefore species can only function physiologically, and successfully complete their life cycles under specific environmental conditions (ideally within a subset of these), changes to climate are likely to have significant impacts on plants from the level of the individual right through to the level of the ecosystem or biome.

Effects of 

 concentrations have been steadily rising for more than two centuries. Increases in atmospheric  concentration affect how plants photosynthesise, resulting in increases in plant water use efficiency, enhanced photosynthetic capacity and increased growth. Increased CO2 has been implicated in 'vegetation thickening' which affects plant community structure and function. Increased CO2 can also lead to increased Carbon : Nitrogen ratios in the leaves of plants or in other aspects of leaf chemistry, possibly changing herbivore nutrition. Studies show that doubled concentrations of CO2 will show an increase in photosynthesis in C3 plants but not in C4 plants. However, it is also shown that  plants are able to persist in drought better than the  plants.

Effects of temperature

Increases in temperature raise the rate of many physiological processes such as photosynthesis in plants, to an upper limit, depending on the type of plant. These increases in photosynthesis and other physiological processes are driven by increased rates of chemical reactions and roughly a doubling of enzymatic product conversion rates for every 10 °C increase in temperature. Extreme temperatures can be harmful when beyond the physiological limits of a plant which will eventually lead to higher desiccation rates.

One common hypothesis among scientists is that the warmer an area is, the higher the plant diversity. This hypothesis can be observed in nature, where higher plant biodiversity is often located at certain latitudes (which often correlates with a specific climate/temperature). Plant species in montane and snowy ecosystems are at greater risk for habitat loss due to climate change. The effects of climate change are predicted to be more severe in mountains of northern latitude.

And emissions continue to rise. As a result, the Earth is now about 1.1 °C warmer than it was in the late 1800s. The last decade (2011-2020) was the warmest on record. Many people think climate change mainly means warmer temperatures. But temperature rise is only the beginning of the story. Because the Earth is a system, where everything is connected, changes in one area can influence changes in all others. The consequences of climate change now include, among others, intense droughts, water scarcity, severe fires, rising sea levels, flooding, melting polar ice, catastrophic storms and declining biodiversity.

Effects of water

As water supply is critical for plant growth, it plays a key role in determining the distribution of plants. Changes in precipitation are predicted to be less consistent than for temperature and more variable between regions, with predictions for some areas to become much wetter, and some much drier. A change in water availability would show a direct correlation to the growth rates and persistence of plant species in that region.

With less consistent, more intense rainfall events the water availability will have a direct impact on the soil moisture in an area. A decrease in soil moisture will have negative impacts on plant's growth, changing the dynamics of the ecosystem as a whole. Plants rely not only on the total rainfall during the growing season, but also the intensity and magnitude of each rainfall event. In addition, drought-like conditions seen more frequently with climate change leave many plant and tree communities vulnerable to fires with a lower chance of survival, significantly decreasing diversity.

General effects
Environmental variables act not in isolation, but in combination with other pressures such as habitat degradation, habitat loss, and the introduction of exotic species that can potentially be invasive. It is suggested that these other drivers of biodiversity change will act in synergy with climate change to increase the pressure on species to survive. As these changes add up, Earth's overall ecosystems are predicted to look much different than they do today. More biologically diverse ecosystems (biodiversity hotspots) such as Mediterranean-type ecosystems are most at risk and sensitive to changes induced by global warming.

Direct impacts

Changes in distributions

If climatic factors such as temperature and precipitation change in a region beyond the tolerance of a species phenotypic plasticity, then distribution changes of the species may be inevitable. There is already evidence that plant species are shifting their ranges in altitude and latitude as a response to changing regional climates. Yet it is difficult to predict how species ranges will change in response to climate and separate these changes from all the other man-made environmental changes such as eutrophication, acid rain and habitat destruction.

When compared to the reported past migration rates of plant species, the rapid pace of current change has the potential to not only alter species distributions, but also render many species as unable to follow the climate to which they are adapted. The environmental conditions required by some species, such as those in alpine regions may disappear altogether. The result of these changes is likely to be a rapid increase in extinction risk. Adaptation to new conditions may also be of great importance in the response of plants.

Predicting the extinction risk of plant species is not easy however. Estimations from particular periods of rapid climatic change in the past have shown relatively little species extinction in some regions, for example. Knowledge of how species may adapt or persist in the face of rapid change is still relatively limited.

It is clear now that the loss of some species will be very dangerous for humans because they will stop providing services. Some of them have unique characteristics that cannot be replaced by any other.

Distributions of species and plant species will narrow following the effects of climate change. Climate change can affect areas such as wintering and breeding grounds to birds. Migratory birds use wintering and breeding grounds as a place to feed and recharge after migrating for long hours. If these areas are damaged due to climate change, it will eventually affect them as well.

Lowland forest have gotten smaller during the last glacial period and those small areas became island which are made up of drought resisting plants. In those small refugee areas there are also a lot of shade dependent plants. As an example , the dynamics of the calcareous grassland were significantly impacted due to the climate factors.

Changes in the suitability of a habitat for a species drive distributional changes by not only changing the area that a species can physiologically tolerate, but how effectively it can compete with other plants within this area. Changes in community composition are therefore also an expected product of climate change.

Changes in life-cycles

The timing of phenological events such as flowering are often related to environmental variables such as temperature. Changing environments are therefore expected to lead to changes in life cycle events, and these have been recorded for many species of plants. These changes have the potential to lead to the asynchrony between species, or to change competition between plants. Both the insect pollinators and plant populations will eventually become extinct due to the uneven and confusing connection that is caused by the change of climate. Flowering times in British plants for example have changed, leading to annual plants flowering earlier than perennials, and insect pollinated plants flowering earlier than wind pollinated plants; with potential ecological consequences. A recently published study has used data recorded by the writer and naturalist Henry David Thoreau to confirm effects of climate change on the phenology of some species in the area of Concord, Massachusetts. Another life-cycle change is warmer winter which can be leads to summer rainfall or summer drought.

Genetic diversity 
Species richness and species evenness play a key role in how quickly and productively an ecosystem can adapt to change. By increasing the possibility of a population bottleneck through more extreme weather events, genetic diversity in the population would drastically decrease. Since genetic diversity is a main contributor of how an ecosystem can evolve, the ecosystem would be much more susceptible to getting wiped out since each individual would be similar to the next. An absence of genetic mutations and decrease in species richness greatly enhances the possibility of extinction.

Altering the environment puts stress on a plant to increase its phenotypic plasticity, causing species to change faster than predicted. These plastic responses will help the plants respond to a fast changing environment. Understanding how native species change in response to the environment will help gather conclusions of how mutualistic relationships will react.

Indirect impacts
All species are likely to be directly impacted by the changes in environmental conditions discussed above, and also indirectly through their interactions with other species. While direct impacts may be easier to predict and conceptualise, it is likely that indirect impacts are equally important in determining the response of plants to climate change. A species whose distribution changes as a direct result of climate change may invade the range of another species or be invaded, for example, introducing a new competitive relationship or altering other processes such as carbon sequestration.

In Europe, the temperature and precipitation effects due to climate change can indirectly affect certain populations of people.  The rise of temperatures and lack of precipitation results in different river floodplains, which reduce the populations of people sensitive to flood risk.

Climate change can have an impact on medicinal plants by altering the environmental conditions of where they grow, to the point where the conditions are no longer ideal and habitable.

The range of a symbiotic fungi associated with plant roots (i.e., mycorrhizae) may directly change as a result of altered climate, resulting in a change in the plant's distribution.

A new grass may spread into a region, altering the fire regime and greatly changing the species composition.

A pathogen or parasite may change its interactions with a plant, such as a pathogenic fungus becoming more common in an area where rainfall increases.

Increased temperatures may allow herbivores to expand further into alpine regions, significantly impacting the composition of alpine herbfields.

Coupled natural and human systems work as systems that influence change over broad spatial and temporal extents that are usually seen as indirect effects of climate change. This is especially true when analyzing spillover systems. Environmental factor#Socioeconomic Drivers

Higher level changes
Species respond in very different ways to climate change. Variation in the distribution, phenology and abundance of species will lead to inevitable changes in the relative abundance of species and their interactions. These changes will flow on to affect the structure and function of ecosystems. Bird migration patterns are already showing a change in flying south sooner, and returning sooner, this could over time affect the overall ecosystem. If birds are leaving sooner this would decrease the pollination rates of some plants over time. The observation of bird migrations is more evidence of the climate changing, which would result in plants flowering at different times.

With certain species of plants having a disadvantage with a warmer climate, their insect herbivores may also be taking a hit. Temperature will directly affect diversity, persistence and survival in both the plants and their insect herbivores. As these insect herbivores decrease, so will the higher levels of species that eat those insects. This cascading event would be detrimental to our earth and how we view nature today.

Challenges of modeling future impacts
Accurate predictions of the future impacts of climate change on plant diversity are critical to the development of conservation strategies. These predictions have come largely from bioinformatic strategies, involving modeling individual species, groups of species such as 'functional types', communities, ecosystems or biomes. They can also involve modeling species observed environmental niches, or observed physiological processes. The velocity of climate change can also be involved in modelling future impacts as well.

Although useful, modeling has many limitations. Firstly, there is uncertainty about the future levels of greenhouse gas emissions driving climate change  and considerable uncertainty in modeling how this will affect other aspects of climate such as local rainfall or temperatures. For most species the importance of specific climatic variables in defining distribution (e.g. minimum rainfall or maximum temperature) is unknown. It is also difficult to know which aspects of a particular climatic variable are most biologically relevant, such as average vs. maximum or minimum temperatures. Ecological processes such as interactions between species and dispersal rates and distances are also inherently complex, further complicating predictions.

Improvement of models is an active area of research, with new models attempting to take factors such as life-history traits of species or processes such as migration into account when predicting distribution changes; though possible trade-offs between regional accuracy and generality are recognised.

Climate change is also predicted to interact with other drivers of biodiversity change such as habitat destruction and fragmentation, or the introduction of foreign species. These threats may possibly act in synergy to increase extinction risk from that seen in periods of rapid climate change in the past. Global warming and climate change are becoming a greater threat the longer we resist doing something about it on a massive scale.Though we’re already seeing its effects in droughts, hurricanes, wildfires, and unprecedented temperature extremes both high and low, it’s not too late to slow it down and mitigate the effects.

See also
 Biogeochemistry
 Desertification
 Extinction risk from climate change
 Effects of climate change
 Effects of climate change on ecosystems
 Mycorrhizae and changing climate
 Systems ecology

References

Further reading

External links
(2008) Government report on the effects of climate change on agriculture, land resources, water resources, and biodiversity in the United States.
(2003) Summary report from an international conference on Global Climate Change and Biodiversity, Joint Nature Conservation Committee
(2008) Discussion on the future of modeling climate change impacts on plant species distributions. on wilfried thuiller's website
(2005) The Millennium Ecosystem Assessment, including discussion of the effects of climate change on biodiversity
Global Change Biology - a scientific journal with articles relating to the interaction between global changes such as climate, and biological systems
(2011) After the birds vanish, the plants are next to go - New Scientist

Biodiversity
Effects of climate change